Horseshoe crabs are marine and brackish water arthropods of the family Limulidae and the only living members of the order Xiphosura. Despite their name, they are not true crabs or crustaceans: they are chelicerates, most closely related to arachnids such as spiders, ticks, and scorpions.

Horseshoe crabs live primarily in and around shallow coastal waters on soft, sandy or muddy bottoms. They are generally found in the intertidal zone at spring high tides. They are eaten in some parts of Asia, and used as fishing bait, in fertilizer and in science (especially Limulus amebocyte lysate). In recent years, population declines have occurred as a consequence of coastal habitat destruction and overharvesting. Tetrodotoxin may be present in one horseshoe crab species, Carcinoscorpius rotundicauda.

The fossil record of Xiphosura goes back over 440 million years to the Ordovician period, with the oldest representatives of the modern family Limulidae dating to approximately 250 million years ago during the Early Triassic. As such, the extant forms have been described as "living fossils". Some molecular analyses have placed Xiphosura within Arachnida, with a 2019 molecular analysis placing them as the sister group of Ricinulei.

Taxonomy 
The family name Limulidae comes from the genus Limulus, from the word limulus in Latin meaning "askance", or "a little askew".

Horseshoe crabs resemble crustaceans but belong to a separate subphylum of the arthropods, Chelicerata. Horseshoe crabs are closely related to the extinct eurypterids (sea scorpions), which include some of the largest arthropods to have ever existed, and the two may be sister groups. Other studies have placed eurypterids closer to the arachnids in a group called Merostomata. The enigmatic Chasmataspidids are also thought to be closely related to the horseshoe crabs. The earliest horseshoe crab fossils are found in strata from the Lower Ordovician period, roughly 480 million years ago.

The Limulidae are the only recent family of the order Xiphosura, and contains all four living species of horseshoe crabs:

 Carcinoscorpius rotundicauda, the mangrove horseshoe crab, found in South and Southeast Asia
 Limulus polyphemus, the Atlantic or American horseshoe crab, found along the Atlantic coast of the United States and the Southeast Gulf of Mexico 
 Tachypleus gigas, the Indo-Pacific, Indonesian, Indian or southern horseshoe crab, found in South and Southeast Asia
 Tachypleus tridentatus, the Chinese, Japanese or tri-spine horseshoe crab, found in Southeast and East Asia

Genera 
After Bicknell et al. 2021 and Lamsdell et al. 2020

 Incertae sedis
 †Albalimulus Bicknell & Pates, 2019 Ballagan Formation, Scotland, Early Carboniferous (Tournaisian) (Considered Xiphosura incertae sedis by Lamsdell, 2020)
†Casterolimulus Holland, Erickson & O'Brien, 1975 Late Cretaceous (Maastrichtian) Fox Hills Formation, North Dakota, USA (Inconsistently placed in this family)
 †Heterolimulus gadeai Vıa & Villalta, 1966 Alcover Limestone Formation, Spain, Middle Triassic (Ladinian)
 †Limulitella Størmer, 1952 Middle-Upper Triassic, France, Germany, Tunisia, Russia
 †Sloveniolimulus Bicknell et al., 2019 Strelovec Formation, Slovenia Middle Triassic (Anisian)
 †Tarracolimulus Romero & Vıa Boada, 1977 Alcover Limestone Formation, Spain, Middle Triassic (Ladinian)
 †Victalimulus Riek & Gill, 1971 Lower Cretaceous (Aptian) Korumburra Group, NSW, Australia
 †Yunnanolimulus Zhang et al., 2009 Middle Triassic (Anisian), Guanling Formation, Yunnan, China
 †Mesolimulus Middle Triassic-Late Cretaceous England, Spain, Siberia, Germany, Morocco
†Ostenolimulus Lamsdell et al. 2021 Early Jurassic (Sinemurian) Moltrasio Limestone, Italy
†Volanalimulus Lamsdell, 2020 Early Triassic, Madagascar.
 Subfamily Limulinae Leach, 1819
 †Crenatolimulus Feldmann et al., 2011 Upper Jurassic (upper Tithonian) Kcynia Formation, Poland. Lower Cretaceous (Albian) Glen Rose Formation, Texas, USA
 Limulus O. F. Müller, 1785 Pierre Shale, United States, Late Cretaceous (Maastrichtian), Atlantic North America, Recent
 Subfamily Tachypleinae Pocock, 1902
 Carcinoscorpius Pocock, 1902, Asia, Recent
 Tachypleus Leach, 1819 Upper Cretaceous (Cenomanian) Haqel and Hjoula Konservat-Lagerstatten, Lebanon, Upper Eocene Domsen Sands, Germany, Asia, Recent
Cladogram after Lasmdell 2020.

Anatomy 

The entire body of the horseshoe crab is protected by a hard carapace. It has two compound lateral eyes, each composed of about 1,000 ommatidia, plus a pair of median eyes that are able to detect both visible light and ultraviolet light, a single parietal eye, and a pair of rudimentary lateral eyes on the top. The latter become functional just before the embryo hatches. Also, a pair of ventral eyes is located near the mouth, as well as a cluster of photoreceptors on the telson. Having relatively poor eyesight, the animals have the largest rods and cones of any known animal, about 100 times the size of humans, and their eyes are a million times more sensitive to light at night than during the day.

They use their chelicerae—a pair of small appendages—for moving food into the mouth. The next five pairs of appendages, the first of which are the pedipalps, are used for locomotion (ambulatory legs). The mouth is located in the center of the legs, whose bases are referred to as gnathobases, and have the same function as jaws and help grind up food. In extant species their appendages are uniramous, but the fossil genus Dibasterium had four pairs of branched walking legs. The pedipalps on a male change shape on their terminal molt, becoming boxing glove-like claspers that are used for grasping the female during mating. The last pair of legs for both male and female are the main legs used for pushing when walking on the ocean floor. The remaining leg pairs have a weak claw at the tip. Lost legs or the telson (tail) may slowly regenerate, and cracks in the body shell can heal.

Behind its legs, the horseshoe crab has book gills, which exchange respiratory gases, and are also occasionally used for swimming.
As in other arthropods, a true endoskeleton is absent, but the body does have an endoskeletal structure made up of cartilaginous plates that support the book gills.

Growth 
Females are about 20–30% larger than males. The smallest species is C. rotundicauda and the largest is T. tridentatus. Some southern populations (in the Yucatán Peninsula) of L. polyphemus are somewhat smaller, but otherwise this species is larger.

This is only about  longer than the largest females of L. polyphemus and T. gigas, but roughly twice the weight.

The juveniles grow about 33% larger with every molt until reaching adult size. Atlantic horseshoe crabs molt in late July.

Diet 
Horseshoe crabs are more often found on the ocean floor searching for worms and molluscs, which are their main food. They may also feed on crustaceans and even small fish.

Breeding 

During the breeding season (spring and summer in the Northeast U.S.; year-round in warmer locations or when the full moon rises), horseshoe crabs migrate to shallow coastal waters. The smaller male horseshoe crab clings to the back or opisthosoma of the larger female using specialized front claws and fertilizes the eggs as they are laid in the sand. Additional males called "satellite males" which are not attached to the female may surround the pair and have some success in fertilizing eggs. Young female horseshoe crabs can be identified by the lack of mating scars.

The female can lay between 60,000 and 120,000 eggs in batches of a few thousand at a time. The eggs may be inseminated within 20 to 30 minutes.  In L. polyphemus, the eggs take about two weeks to hatch; shore birds eat many of them before they hatch. The larvae molt six times during the first year and annually after the first 3 or 4 years.

Natural breeding of horseshoe crabs in captivity has proven to be difficult. Some evidence indicates that mating takes place only in the presence of the sand or mud in which the horseshoe crab's eggs were hatched; it is not known with certainty what is in the sand that the crabs can sense or how they sense it. Artificial insemination and induced spawning have been done on a relatively large scale in captivity, and eggs and juveniles collected from the wild are often raised to adulthood in captivity.

In order to preserve and ensure the continuous supply of the horseshoe crab, a breeding centre was built in Johor, Malaysia where the crabs are bred and released back into the ocean in thousands once every two years. It is estimated to take around 12 years before they are suitable for consumption.

Relationships with humans

Blood harvesting 
Horseshoe crabs use hemocyanin to carry oxygen through their blood. Because of the copper present in hemocyanin, their blood is blue. Their blood contains amebocytes, which play a similar role to the white blood cells of vertebrates in defending the organism against pathogens. Amebocytes from the blood of L. polyphemus are used to make Limulus amebocyte lysate (LAL), which is used for the detection of bacterial endotoxins in medical applications. There is a high demand for the blood, the harvest of which involves collecting and bleeding the animals, and then releasing them back into the sea. Most of the animals survive the process; mortality is correlated with both the amount of blood extracted from an individual animal, and the stress experienced during handling and transportation. Estimates of mortality rates following blood harvesting vary from 3–15% to 10–30%. Approximately 500,000 Limulus are harvested annually for this purpose.

Bleeding may also prevent female horseshoe crabs from being able to spawn or decrease the number of eggs they are able to lay. Up to 30% of an individual's blood is removed, according to the biomedical industry, and the horseshoe crabs spend between one and three days away from the ocean before being returned. As long as the gills stay moist, they can survive on land for four days. Some scientists are skeptical that certain companies return their horseshoe crabs to the ocean at all, instead suspecting them of selling the horseshoe crabs as fishing bait.

The harvesting of horseshoe crab blood in the pharmaceutical industry is in decline. In 1986, Kyushu University researchers discovered that the same test could be achieved by using isolated Limulus clotting factor C (rFC), an enzyme found in LAL, as by using LAL itself. Jeak Ling Ding, a National University of Singapore researcher, patented a process for manufacturing rFC; on 8 May 2003, synthetic isolated rFC made via her patented process became available for the first time. Industry at first took little interest in the new product, however, as it was patent-encumbered, not yet approved by regulators, and sold by a single manufacturer, Lonza Group. In 2013, however, Hyglos GmbH also began manufacturing its own rFC product. This, combined with the acceptance of rFC by European regulators, the comparable cost between LAL and rFC, and support from Eli Lilly and Company, which has committed to use rFC in lieu of LAL, is projected to all but end the practice of blood harvesting from horseshoe crabs.

In December 2019, a report of the US Senate which encouraged the Food and Drug Administration to "establish processes for evaluating alternative pyrogenicity tests and report back [to the Senate] on steps taken to increase their use" was released; PETA backed the report.

In June 2020, it was reported that U.S. Pharmacopeia had declined to give rFC equal standing with horseshoe crab blood. Without the approval for the classification as an industry standard testing material, U.S. companies will have to overcome the scrutiny of showing that rFC is safe and effective for their desired uses, which may serve as a deterrent for usage of the horseshoe crab blood substitute.

Vaccine research and development during the COVID-19 pandemic has added additional "strain on the American horseshoe crab."

Fishery 
Horseshoe crabs are used as bait to fish for eels (mostly in the United States) and whelk, or conch. Nearly 1 million (1,000,000) crabs a year are harvested for bait in the United States, dwarfing the biomedical mortality. However, fishing with horseshoe crab was banned indefinitely in New Jersey in 2008 with a moratorium on harvesting to protect the red knot, a shorebird which eats the crab's eggs. A moratorium was restricted to male crabs in Delaware, and a permanent moratorium is in effect in South Carolina. The eggs are eaten in parts of Southeast Asia, Johor and China.

A low horseshoe crab population in the Delaware Bay is hypothesized to endanger the future of the red knot. Red knots, long-distance migratory shorebirds, feed on the protein-rich eggs during their stopovers on the beaches of New Jersey and Delaware. An effort is ongoing to develop adaptive-management plans to regulate horseshoe crab harvests in the bay in a way that protects migrating shorebirds.

Culinary use 
The population of T. gigas in Indonesia and Malaysia has decreased dramatically in the past decade. The harvesting of T. gigas is largely used to supply Thailand with primarily female T. gigas, which is considered a local delicacy. This female biased harvesting has led to an unbalanced sex ratio in the wild, which also contributes to its declining population in the area.

Conservation status 
Development along shorelines is dangerous to horseshoe crab spawning, limiting available space and degrading habitat. Bulkheads can block access to intertidal spawning regions as well.

Because of the destruction of habitat and shoreline development, use in fishing, plastic pollution, status as a culinary delicacy in some areas, and use for scientific research and advancements, the horseshoe crab is facing down endangered and extinct statuses. One species, T. tridentatus, has already been declared extinct in one area of Taiwan. Facing a greater than 90% population decrease in T. tridentatus juveniles, it is suspected that Hong Kong will be the next to declare the horseshoe crab extinct in its area. The species is listed as endangered on the IUCN Red List, specifically because of overexploitation and loss of critical habitat leading to a steep decline in population size.

References

Further reading

External links 
 
 When the Horseshoe Crabs Are Gone, We’ll Be in Trouble. New York Times 2023
 LAL Update
 Science Friday Video: horseshoe crab season
 Horseshoe crab at the Smithsonian Ocean Portal
 The Horseshoe Crab – Medical Uses; The Ecological Research & Development Group (ERDG)
 RedKnot.org links to shorebird recovery sites, movies, events & other info on Red Knot rufa & horseshoe crabs.
 Crab Bleeders Article about the men who bleed horseshoe crabs for science.
 Day time mating of horseshoe crabs in Maine
 Sarah Zhang, The Last Days of the Blue-Blood Harvest, The Atlantic, May 9, 2018

Extant Ordovician first appearances
Xiphosura